Aaargh! is a single-player action video game in which the player controls a giant monster with the goal of obtaining eggs by destroying buildings in different cities across a lost island. It was designed for Mastertronic's Arcadia Systems, an arcade machine based on the custom hardware of the Amiga, and was released in 1987. It was ported to a range of other platforms and released on these across 1988 and 1989. Electronic Arts distributed the Amiga version of the game.

Gameplay

The goal of the game is to find the golden dragon's egg. The player controls one of two monsters who must destroy buildings in order to find Roc eggs, the discovery of each of which triggers a fight with a rival monster. When five eggs are found, the two monsters fight on a volcano to claim the dragon's egg.

The game is an action game with fighting game elements. The player chooses to play as either a dragon-like lizard or an ogre (depicted as a cyclops in the game); the character that the player does not select becomes the player's rival to obtain the egg. In the arcade version of the game either one or two players could play simultaneously, whereas on the ports only one player could play at a time.

Gameplay takes place across the ten cities of the Lost Island, each representing a different era of civilisation (such as ancient Egypt and the Wild West) and each comprising one level of the game. Each city is represented by a single static playing area that uses a form of 2.5D projection in order to give the impression of depth on the screen.

Reception

The game received mixed reviews from gaming magazines across the platforms to which it was ported, with scores ranging from around 2/10 (or equivalent) up to almost 9/10.

While reviewers praised the graphics and sound, particularly on the Amiga port, they criticised the gameplay. ACE magazine said that although the game had "good graphics, atmospheric sound and good gameplay" there was not enough challenge to the game and that players would "not want to spend much time playing a game you know you can beat easily." ZX Spectrum reviewers were unimpressed by the fact that the game required levels to be loaded individually, with Your Sinclair magazine describing it as a "multi-level, multi-load, beat 'em, blowtorch 'em up which'll have you screaming its title each time you die and have to reload."

The game was reviewed in 1989 in Dragon #141 by Patricia Hartley and Kirk Lesser in "The Role of Computers" column. The reviewers normally assign a rating to a game ranging from 1 up to 5 stars, but they disliked this game so much that they ranked it with an "X" instead.

See also
Crush, Crumble and Chomp! (1981)
Rampage (1986)
The Movie Monster Game (1986)

References

External links

Aaargh! at Hall of Light

1987 video games
Amiga games
Amstrad CPC games
Apple IIGS games
Atari ST games
Commodore 64 games
DOS games
Fighting games
Kaiju video games
Classic Mac OS games
MSX games
ZX Spectrum games
Video games about reptiles
Video games developed in the United States
Roc (mythology)
Single-player video games
Binary Design games